Euphaedra judith, or Judith's striped forester, is a butterfly in the family Nymphalidae. It is found in Guinea, Sierra Leone, Liberia and western Ivory Coast. The habitat consists of forests.

Description
 
E. judith Weym. has in the male a triangular green subapical band and a small green hindmarginal spot on the upperside of the forewing and in the female a greenish yellow subapical band and a long yellowish green hindmarginal spot on the forewing. Sierra Leone and Congo

References

Butterflies described in 1892
judith
Butterflies of Africa